Baron Wardington, of Alnmouth in the County of Northumberland, was a title in the Peerage of the United Kingdom. It was created in 1936 for John William Beaumont Pease, Chairman of Lloyds Bank from 1922 to 1945. The third Baron succeeded his elder brother in 2005. The titles became extinct on the latter's death in March 2019.

The family seat was Wardington Manor, near Banbury in Oxfordshire.

Barons Wardington (1936)
 John William Beaumont Pease, 1st Baron Wardington (1869–1950)
 Christopher Henry Beaumont Pease, 2nd Baron Wardington (1924–2005)
 William Simon Pease, 3rd Baron Wardington (1925–2019)

References

 Kidd, Charles, Williamson, David (editors). Debrett's Peerage and Baronetage (1990 edition). New York: St Martin's Press, 1990, 
 

Extinct baronies in the Peerage of the United Kingdom
Pease family
Noble titles created in 1936